Cheldon is a village and former civil parish,  north-west of Exeter, now in the parish of Chulmleigh, in the North Devon district, in the county of Devon, England. In 1961, the parish had a population of 32.

Features 
Cheldon has a church called St Mary with a 12th century font and 16th century bells.

History 
The name "Cheldon" means "Ceadela's hill". Cheldon was recorded in the Domesday Book as Cadeldone/Cheledone/Cha(d)eledona. The parish was historically in the Witheridge hundred. On 1 April 1986, the civil parish was abolished and merged with Chulmleigh.

References

External links

Villages in Devon
Former civil parishes in Devon
Chulmleigh